The Case Memorial-Seymour Library is a historic library building located at 176 Genesee Street in Auburn.  It was built in 1898 and as designed by architects Carrère and Hastings, in the Beaux-Arts style.  It is a square, two story, three bay building constructed of Flemish bond brick and limestone topped by a hipped roof. It opened in 1903 and was  expanded in 1972.

The building was listed on the National Register of Historic Places in 1980.

See also
National Register of Historic Places listings in Cayuga County, New York

References
Notes

External links

Seymour Library Home Page

Library buildings completed in 1903
Libraries on the National Register of Historic Places in New York (state)
Beaux-Arts architecture in New York (state)
Buildings and structures in Auburn, New York
National Register of Historic Places in Cayuga County, New York